The Ultimate Collection is a 2000 album by Patsy Cline. In 2003 it was ranked number 234 in Rolling Stone's 'The 500 Greatest Albums of All Time', with the ranking slipping to number 235 in a 2012 update and climbing to number 229 in the 2020 reboot of the list.

Track listing

Disc 1
 "Walkin' After Midnight" – 2:35
 "A Poor Man's Roses (Or a Rich Man's Gold)" – 2:47
 "Lovesick Blues" – 2:18
 "I Fall to Pieces" – 2:48
 "True Love" – 2:08
 "San Antonio Rose" – 2:20
 "Crazy" – 2:44
 "Have You Ever Been Lonely (Have You Ever Been Blue)" – 2:12
 "South of the Border (Down Mexico Way)" – 2:26
 "Strange" – 2:12
 "I Love You So Much It Hurts" – 2:15
 "Foolin' Around" – 2:13
 "Bill Bailey, Won't You Please Come Home" – 2:48
 "She's Got You" – 3:00
 "Heartaches" – 2:12
 "Your Cheatin' Heart" – 2:20

Disc 2
 "Anytime" – 1:59
 "So Wrong" – 3:01
 "Half as Much" – 2:28
 "When I Get Thru With You (You'll Love Me Too)" – 2:39
 "Imagine That" – 2:55
 "When You Need a Laugh" – 2:50
 "Why Can't He Be You" – 3:27
 "Back in Baby's Arms" – 2:04
 "Leavin' on Your Mind" – 2:25
 "Faded Love" – 3:45
 "Someday (You'll Want Me to Want You)" – 2:51
 "Blue Moon of Kentucky" – 2:10
 "Always" – 2:42
 "He Called Me Baby" – 2:41
 "Crazy Arms" – 2:25
 "Sweet Dreams" – 2:32

References

Patsy Cline albums
2000 compilation albums